Isaar or ISAAR may refer to:
Isaar, Wisconsin, an unincorporated community in the USA
International Standard Archival Authority Record, or ISAAR, a form of authority control record